Heather Lind (born March 22, 1983) is an American actress. She is known for her portrayal of Anna Strong in the AMC series Turn: Washington's Spies. She is the twin sister of actress Christina Bennett Lind.

Early life and education
Lind was born in Upland, Pennsylvania, and was raised in Guilderland, New York. She earned her Bachelor of Arts in 2005 at Fordham University and her Master of Fine Arts in acting at New York University's Graduate Acting program.

Career
Lind made her Broadway debut in the Shakespeare in the Park production The Merchant of Venice, in which she played Jessica, the daughter of Shylock, played by Al Pacino. She was awarded the 67th annual Theatre World Award for Outstanding Broadway or Off-Broadway Debut Performances during the 2010-2011 theatrical season.

In 2011, Lind played Katy, Margaret Thompson's maid, in the HBO series Boardwalk Empire.

She also narrates on the audiobook of Cassandra Clare's Clockwork Prince along with Ed Westwick.

MeToo campaign
As part of the #MeToo campaign, in late October 2017, Lind accused former President George H. W. Bush of sexually assaulting her during a publicity photo for her series, Turn: Washington's Spies. Lind wrote in an Instagram post that Bush "sexually assaulted me while I was posing for a similar photo. He didn't shake my hand. He touched me from behind from his wheelchair with his wife Barbara Bush by his side. He told me a dirty joke. And then, all the while being photographed, touched me again." Lind later deleted her post.

Bush's spokesman responded, "at age 93, President Bush has been confined to a wheelchair for roughly five years, so his arm falls on the lower waist of people with whom he takes pictures. To try to put people at ease, the president routinely tells the same joke—and on occasion, he has patted women's rears in what he intended to be a good-natured manner. Some have seen it as innocent; others clearly view it as inappropriate. To anyone he has offended, President Bush apologizes most sincerely."

Filmography

Film

Television

References

External links

 

American television actresses
American film actresses
American stage actresses
Identical twin actresses
Fordham University alumni
Tisch School of the Arts alumni
American twins
1983 births
Living people
People from Delaware County, Pennsylvania
People from Guilderland, New York
20th-century American actresses
American child actresses
Actresses from New York (state)
Actresses from Pennsylvania
21st-century American actresses
Theatre World Award winners